Victor Wolfson (8 March 1909 – May 24, 1990) was an American dramatist, director, writer, producer, and actor.

Biography

Victor Wolfson began his professional career organizing acting clubs for striking coal miners in West Virginia. He soon found his passion for writing and he wrote numerous plays for Broadway, dramas for television and many novels. He wrote professionally until his death. Wolfson attended the first class of the University of Wisconsin Experimental College, where he founded their theater group, the Experimental College Players.

His life's work was playwriting and he adapted most of his plays from novels. His Broadway productions included the 1937 comedy Excursion, as well as Bitter Stream, adapted from Fontamara by Ignazio Silone, Pastoral, The Family, Pride's Crossing, and Seventh Heaven by Victor Young. His novels included The Lonely Steeple and The Eagle on the Plain and he also wrote for Harper's Magazine between 1948 and 1960. 
In 1961, he wrote several episodes for ABC's 26-part television series Winston Churchill: The Valiant Years which earned him an Emmy Award 1960-1961 for Outstanding Writing Achievement in the Documentary Field. 
He died, aged 81,  in a fire at his home in Wellfleet, Massachusetts, United States 

Wolfson's parents, Adolph Wolfson and Rebecca Hochstein Wolfson, who were Jewish, were political radicals who emigrated from Russia in 1894 to escape the pervasive anti-semitism and political persecution of the Tsarist regime. His sister Theresa Wolfson was an economist and prolific writer.

Filmography
1966 Rings Around the World (documentary) (screenplay / story)
1964 The Finest Hours (documentary)
1960 Winston Churchill: The Valiant Years (TV series documentary)  (writer)
1956-1960 Alfred Hitchcock Presents (TV series) teleplay
1956 Climax! (TV series)
1956 Front Row Center (TV series) based on his own novel Midsummer Madness
1956 Kraft Theatre (TV series)
1954 Janet Dean, Registered Nurse (TV series)
1951-1952 Suspense (TV series) teleplay and writer – 8 episodes
1959 Invisible Man (TV series) scenario editor - 3 episodes

Plays 

1955 Seventh Heaven. Musical by Victor Young- Co-writer with Stella Unger.
1950 Pride's Crossing  Drama - Writer
1943 The Family. Based on the novel by Nina Federova.  - Writer.
1939 Pastoral Comedy - . Writer
1937 Excursion Comedy - Writer
1936 Bitter Stream - Based on the novel Fontamara by Ignazio Silone - Writer
1935 Mother - Stage Director
1935 Crime and Punishment - Drama. Writer, Producer and Stage Director.
1932 Counsellor-At-Law. Revival -Performed as 'A Tall Man'. Counsellor at Law was made into a film in 1933.
1931 Counsellor-at-Law. Drama. Directed by William Wyler. - Performed as 'A Tall Man'
1926 Mixed Bill -Writer

Books
1969 The Mayerling Murder, a book about the Mayerling Incident.
1967 Midsummer Madness
1966 The Man who Cared: A Life of Harry S. Truman
1962 My Prince! My King!
1947 The Eagle on the Plain
1945 The Lonely Steeple
1937 Excursion: A play in three acts

References

External links 

Obituary in The New York Times
Time magazine Excursion Review
Broadwayworld Profile
LibraryThing list of written works
Listed as cast for Counsellor of Law
Movieweb profile
Excursion promotional poster

20th-century American novelists
American male novelists
American television writers
American film producers
1909 births
1990 deaths
Emmy Award winners
American male screenwriters
Novelists from New York (state)
Jewish American dramatists and playwrights
20th-century American dramatists and playwrights
American male television writers
American male dramatists and playwrights
20th-century American businesspeople
20th-century American male writers
Screenwriters from New York (state)
20th-century American screenwriters
20th-century American Jews